Dendropsophus brevifrons is a species of frog in the family Hylidae.
It is found in Brazil, Colombia, Ecuador, French Guiana, Peru, and possibly Suriname.
Its natural habitats are subtropical or tropical moist lowland forests, subtropical or tropical swamps, subtropical or tropical high-altitude grassland, intermittent freshwater marshes, pastureland, rural gardens, and urban areas.
It is threatened by habitat loss.

References

brevifrons
Amphibians of Brazil
Amphibians of Colombia
Amphibians of Ecuador
Amphibians of French Guiana
Amphibians of Peru
Amphibians described in 1974
Taxonomy articles created by Polbot